Alexis Joel Zárate Maldonado (born 8 May 1994) was an Argentine footballer who played as a right back.

Club career
Zárate's career started with Independiente in 2013, making his professional bow during a win over Boca Unidos in the Copa Argentina on 22 May; his first league appearance arrived a month later against Colón. Zárate scored the first goal of his career versus Godoy Cruz in October 2014. On 1 January 2016, fellow Argentine Primera División team Temperley loaned Zárate until December 2017. He scored goals against Huracán and Colón throughout thirty-one appearances for Temperley. In January 2018, Latvian Higher League side FK Liepāja completed the signing of Zárate. He made his debut in a March win over Riga FC.

International career
2011 saw Zárate win a total of nine caps for the Argentina U17s at the 2011 South American Under-17 Football Championship and 2011 FIFA U-17 World Cup.

Personal life
In September 2017, Zárate was convicted of rape. However, he remained free during the appeals process and was allowed to join Latvia's FK Liepāja in March 2018. Zárate's appeal was rejected by the Supreme Court of Argentina on 3 December 2018, with final sentencing to be decided. A year later, on 5 December 2019, a court in Buenos Aires rejected Zárate's second appeal. Despite this, a Lomas de Zamora court denied a request for Zárate to be arrested on 16 December; with the Supreme Court case still pending. On 3 July 2020, Zárate was arrested after the court rejected his appeal and jailed to serve his six-and-a-half-year sentence. He subsequently filed a further complaint appeal to the Supreme Court, which was rejected on 16 June 2022 and the ex-football player will have to spend his six-and-a-half years sentence imprisoned.

Career statistics
.

References

External links

1994 births
Living people
Sportspeople from Córdoba Province, Argentina
Argentine footballers
Argentina youth international footballers
Association football fullbacks
Argentine expatriate footballers
Expatriate footballers in Latvia
Argentine Primera División players
Primera Nacional players
Latvian Higher League players
Club Atlético Independiente footballers
Club Atlético Temperley footballers
FK Liepāja players
Association football controversies
Prisoners and detainees of Argentina
Argentine prisoners and detainees